Fort Scott Community College is a community college in Fort Scott, Kansas, United States. It has satellite buildings in other cities in Crawford County, including Pittsburg and Frontenac, along with sites in Paola and at the Hillsdale Learning Center.

History 
Fort Scott is the oldest community college in Kansas, founded in 1919. (Highland Community College is older, but was not founded as a junior college.)

Campuses 
The main campus is in Fort Scott on Horton Street, but there are satellite locations in other cities in Crawford County, including Pittsburg and Frontenac, along with sites in Paola and at Hillsdale, Kansas.

Fort Scott Community College has had a full service outreach center in Paola for more than a decade. Students at the Miami County Campus can take day, evening, weekend, or online classes. In addition, the Miami County Campus also offers counseling services, remedial classes, and workshops. In the newly renovated facility, a community room is also available for public use.

Academic profile 
The college has 2000 students. The Pittsburg campus offers classes in Administrative Assistant, Business Computers, Construction Trades, Cosmetology, Harley-Davidson Technician, John Deere Ag Technician, Heating, Ventilation, Air Conditioning, & Refrigeration, Manicurist, Masonry, Medical Office Assistant, and Welding. The FSCC sites in Frontenac have courses covering Harley Davidson and John Deere training.

Athletics

Fort Scott Community College's mascot is Gizmo the Greyhound. The school colors are maroon and gray.

FSCC sponsors volleyball, men's and women's basketball, baseball and softball programs which compete in the Kansas Jayhawk Community College Conference, which is a member of the National Junior College Athletic Association. There are also men's and women's rodeo teams, which compete in the Central Plains Region of the National Intercollegiate Rodeo Association.

Football was dropped by the school during the 2021–2022 academic year due to "cumulative effect of limited resources, changes in Kansas Jayhawk Community College Conference (KJCCC) football eligibility rules in 2016, and the changing ethos of football in general." Fort Scott's football team won the 1970 NJCAA National Championship and was national-runner up in 1971, 1972 and 2009.

Track and cross-country were dropped by the school prior to the 2010–2011 academic year due to a lack of participation but have since been reinstated.

Notable people 
 Davon Coleman, NFL football player
 Charlie Cowdrey, football coach
 Lavonte David, NFL football player
 Jermarcus Hardrick, CFL football player
 Adam LaRoche, retired MLB player
 John Means, MLB baseball player
 Frank Middleton, retired NFL Football Player
 Jason Pierre-Paul, NFL football player
 Jason Sudeikis, actor
 Jacquian Williams, former NFL player
 Charles Wright, former NFL player
 Brandin Bryant, NFL football player

References

External links
 

 
Education in Bourbon County, Kansas
Education in Crawford County, Kansas
Community colleges in Kansas
Two-year colleges in the United States
Universities and colleges in Pittsburg, Kansas
1919 establishments in Kansas
NJCAA athletics
Educational institutions established in 1919